The 15 cm Kanone 39 (15 cm K 39) was a German heavy gun used in the Second World War. First deliveries began in 1940 to the Wehrmacht. In the Battle of France, only the independent Artillerie-Batterie 698 was equipped with the gun. For Operation Barbarossa, it served with the Artillerie-Abteilungen 680, 731, 740 and 800. A year later, for Fall Blau, they served with Artillerie-Abteilungen 511, 620, 680, 767 and 800.

Design and history
Designed by Krupp as a dual-purpose heavy field and coast defence gun in the late-1930s for Turkey. Only two had been delivered before the rest were appropriated by the Heer upon the outbreak of World War II. In the coast defense role, it was provided with an elaborate portable turntable. This had a central platform and twelve radial struts that connected to an outer ring. In action, the trails would be locked together and put on a small trolley that rode on the outer ring. Coarse aiming was by cranking the trolley back and forth while fine laying was done by traversing the gun on its mount, up to the 6° limit imposed by the closed trails.

For transport, it broke down into two loads, the barrel being removed and carried on its own wagon. A third wagon was necessary to carry the firing platform. It could fire the same ammunition as the 15 cm Kanone 18 as well as its own special ammunition designed to Turkish specifications.

References 
 Engelmann, Joachim and Scheibert, Horst. Deutsche Artillerie 1934-1945: Eine Dokumentation in Text, Skizzen und Bildern: Ausrüstung, Gliederung, Ausbildung, Führung, Einsatz. Limburg/Lahn, Germany: C. A. Starke, 1974
 Gander, Terry and Chamberlain, Peter. Weapons of the Third Reich: An Encyclopedic Survey of All Small Arms, Artillery and Special Weapons of the German Land Forces 1939-1945. New York: Doubleday, 1979 
 Hogg, Ian V. German Artillery of World War Two. 2nd corrected edition. Mechanicsville: Stackpole Books, 1997 
 Weapon Production Totals on Sinews of War

Notes

World War II artillery of Germany
150 mm artillery
Coastal artillery
Military equipment introduced in the 1930s